Aaron Groom (born 23 June 1987) is a Fijian professional rugby league footballer who plays for the Asquith Magpies in the Ron Massey Cup. Groom previously played for the Canterbury-Bankstown Bulldogs in the National Rugby League and Sheffield Eagles in the 2009 Challenge Cup.

Background
Groom was born in Suva, Fiji.

Career
Groom previously played for Canterbury-Bankstown in 2008, and made his début against the Gold Coast Titans in round 10 of the 2008 season. Groom was previously with the Manly-Warringah Sea Eagles in the NRL.

Groom played in the 2008 Rugby League World Cup for Fiji, being named man of the match in the Bati's victory over France.

Groom signed with the Sheffield Eagles for the 2009-2010 seasons but suffered a serious knee injury that limited his appearances in England.

Groom then went on to play for the Asquith Magpies in the North Sydney-Manly local A Grade competition and joined the North Sydney Bears for the 2013 season, making his first appearance for them in Round 4 against Illawarra.

Groom was named in the Fiji squad for the 2013 Rugby League World Cup. Groom scored the opening try and was named man of the match in Fiji's quarter-final victory over Samoa. Groom played 6 games for Norths in The 2013 NSW Cup

In May 2014, Groom played for Fiji in the 2014 Pacific Rugby League International.

In 2014, Groom returned to the Asquith Magpies in the Ron Massey Cup and went on to captain the side.

References

External links
Bulldogs profile
Rookies ready to rumble

1987 births
Sportspeople from Suva
Fijian rugby league players
Fijian people of I-Taukei Fijian descent
Fijian people of British descent
Australian expatriate sportspeople in England
Australian people of I-Taukei Fijian descent
Fiji national rugby league team players
Canterbury-Bankstown Bulldogs players
Sheffield Eagles players
North Sydney Bears NSW Cup players
Rugby league halfbacks
Rugby league hookers
Fijian emigrants to Australia
Living people